Keinan Vincent Joseph Davis (born 13 February 1998) is an English professional footballer who plays as a forward for EFL Championship club Watford, on loan from Aston Villa. Following youth spells at Stevenage and Biggleswade Town he moved to the Aston Villa academy at the age of 17 in December 2015 and made his first team debut just over a year later against Tottenham Hotspur in the FA Cup in January 2017.

Club career

Early career 
Davis grew up in Stevenage and went to The Nobel School. He started his football career within the Stevenage F.C. academy but was released by coach Darren Sarll in 2015. Keinan was then picked up by Biggleswade Town under-18 coach Dave Northfield.

Aston Villa 
In December 2015, following a four-week trial after being scouted in a friendly between Biggleswade Town Under-18s and an Aston Villa youth side, Davis signed for Aston Villa on an 18-month professional contract.

Manager Steve Bruce gave Davis his Villa debut on 8 January 2017, coming off the bench against Tottenham Hotspur in the FA Cup, Villa lost 2–0. Davis was given his league debut on 14 January 2017 against Wolverhampton Wanderers. Davis scored his first professional goal away to Barnsley on 16 September 2017.

On 22 September 2020, Davis was given a new Aston Villa contract extension to keep him with the club until 2024. On 25 April 2021, Davis scored his first Premier League goal, an injury time equaliser against West Bromwich Albion.

Nottingham Forest (loan) 
On 1 January 2022, Davis joined Championship side Nottingham Forest on loan for the rest of the season. He made his Forest debut on 9 January, in a 1–0 FA Cup victory over Arsenal. Davis got his first goal for Nottingham Forest on 25 January 2022, in a 3–0 victory over Barnsley. On June 10, 2022, Forest announced that Davis would return to Villa once his loan expired.

Watford (loan) 
On 13 August 2022, Watford announced the signing of Davis on a season-long loan. He scored his first goal for Watford in a 2-2 draw with Sunderland on 17 September 2022. He scored his second in the 30th minute against Norwich on the 15 October 2022, to make the score 2-0 to Slaven Bilic's men.

Career statistics

Honours
Aston Villa
EFL Championship play-offs: 2019
EFL Cup runner-up: 2019–20
Nottingham Forest
EFL Championship play-offs: 2022

References

External links

England profile at The Football Association

1998 births
Living people
English footballers
England youth international footballers
People from Stevenage
Footballers from Hertfordshire
Association football forwards
Stevenage F.C. players
Biggleswade Town F.C. players
Aston Villa F.C. players
Nottingham Forest F.C. players
Watford F.C. players
English Football League players
Premier League players